Marynyn is a village in Rivne Raion, Rivne Oblast, Ukraine, but was formerly administered within Berezne Raion. In 2001 the community had 931 residents. Postal code — 35670. In 2017, a postage stamp featuring the coat of arms of Marynyn was released by Ukrposhta.

References

External links 
 Marynyn and it legend 
 Ukraine Inkognita. Marynyn 

Villages in Rivne Raion